Amjad Ali (born 25 September 1979) is a Pakistani-born cricketer who played for the United Arab Emirates national cricket team. A left-handed batsman, right-arm medium pace bowler and wicket-keeper, he made his One Day International (ODI) debut for the United Arab Emirates national cricket team in 2008. He previously played first-class cricket for Lahore Blues in Pakistan, and has also played first-class cricket for the UAE in the ICC Intercontinental Cup.

Biography

Born in Lahore in 1979, Chaudhry first played for the Lahore Blues in the Quaid-e-Azam Trophy in 2002. He played twice that season, and once more in 2003, ending his first-class career in Pakistan, though he did play in a minor tournament for Lahore East Zone Blues later in 2003.

He first played for the UAE in an 2007–08 ICC Intercontinental Cup match against Namibia in January 2008, and has gone on to play three more matches in that tournament. He played two ODIs for his adopted country in the 2008 Asia Cup and most recently represented them in the 2008 ACC Trophy Elite tournament.

References

Emirati cricketers
1979 births
Living people
Pakistani cricketers
United Arab Emirates One Day International cricketers
United Arab Emirates Twenty20 International cricketers
Pakistani emigrants to the United Arab Emirates
Pakistani expatriate sportspeople in the United Arab Emirates
Cricketers from Lahore
Lahore Blues cricketers
Cricketers at the 2015 Cricket World Cup
Wicket-keepers